The River Ouse swing bridge is a road bridge over the River Ouse in North Yorkshire, England. It was opened in 2004 when the A63 road bypassed the town of Selby, which traffic previously had to go through to cross the river. It is one of several bridges over the River Ouse between York and the mouth of the Ouse, where it joins the River Trent.

History
Until the A63 bypass was opened, traffic through the town of Selby was measured at 18,000 vehicles per day, of which at least 10% were heavy goods vehicles (HGVs). The main contractor on the bypass project was Skansa, with engineering and design carried out by High Point Rendel. The route of the bypass and bridge was fully opened in June 2004. The swing bridge takes between eight to ten minutes to open for river traffic. On 22 June 2004, eleven days after it was opened, the bridge became stuck in the open position after it had been moved to allow a river vessel through. The issue was caused by a design problem with the hydraulic jacks on the bridge.

The bridge consists of two fixed girders connected to an orthotropic deck. The  swing section aligns to the eastern bank. This height clearance is determined from the normal water line away from exceptional tides.

References

Sources

External links

Bypass legislation order

Bridges across the River Ouse, Yorkshire
Bridges completed in 2004
Bridges in the East Riding of Yorkshire
Road bridges in England
2004 establishments in England
Selby
Bridges in North Yorkshire